Events in the year 1874 in India.

Incumbents
Thomas Baring, 1st Earl of Northbrook, Viceroy

Events
National income - ₹3,507 million
Bihar famine of 1873–74
East India Company Dissolved.

Law
Married Women's Property Act
Civil Jails Act
East India Annuity Funds Act (British statute)
East India Loan Act (British statute)
Courts (Colonial) Jurisdiction Act (British statute)
Colonial Clergy Act (British statute)

Births
Kavi Kalapi, poet (died 1900)

References 

 
India
Years of the 19th century in India